Galium intermedium is a species of plants in the family Rubiaceae. It is native to Central and eastern Europe (Austria, the Czech Republic, Germany, Hungary, Poland, France, Albania, Romania, Bulgaria, Turkey, Belarus, the Baltic States, Ukraine, western Russia and the former Yugoslavia). It is also reportedly naturalized in Santa Clara County, California.

References

External links
Blumen in Schwaben, Klebende Labkräuter 
Plantarium, Описание таксона Galium intermedium 

intermedium
Flora of Austria
Flora of the Czech Republic
Flora of Germany
Flora of Hungary
Flora of Poland
Flora of France
Flora of Albania
Flora of Romania
Flora of Bulgaria
Flora of Turkey
Flora of Belarus
Flora of Ukraine
Flora of Russia
Flora of California
Flora of Croatia
Flora of Serbia
Plants described in 1809
Flora without expected TNC conservation status